The Kraken botnet is a network hacking spyware program that attacks Microsoft Windows and  Apple Macintosh systems through email and World Wide Web sites such as social networking sites. It was the world's largest botnet 

Researchers say that Kraken infected machines in at least 50 of the Fortune 500 companies and grew to over 400,000 bots. It was estimated to send 9 billion spam messages per day. Kraken botnet malware may have been designed to evade anti-virus software, and employed techniques to stymie conventional anti-virus software.

See also
 Computer worm
 Internet bot

References

External links
 Fisher, Dennis, Kraken botnet balloons to dangerous levels, SearchSecurity.com, Apr. 7, 2008, retrieved 2008-04-07
Orion, Egan, There's a new botnet worm on the loose: Kraken seeks to sink the Fortune 500, The Inquirer, April 7, 2008, retrieved 2008-04-07
 Neri, Kraken Botnet, la Botnet mas grande del Mundo, retrieved 2008-04-07, en español.
 Pierce, Cody, 
 Amini, Pedram, Kraken Botnet Infiltration, 2008-04-28, retrieved 2008-04-28

Internet security
Distributed computing projects
Spamming
Botnets